Mabangis na Lungsod is a story written by Efren Abueg. The story is all about Adong (beggar) who lives in the front of the church of Quiapo begging for food and money.

References

Philippine literature